Cumberland Lake is a glacial lake of Saskatchewan, Canada.
Cumberland House and Cumberland House Provincial Historic Park are located on the south shore and is accessed by Highway 123. The community has been subject to floods from the Saskatchewan River. The lake was an interior hub of fur trade routes travelled by Voyageurs during the fur trade era.

Fish species
The lake supports a variety of fish species. These include walleye, sauger, yellow perch, northern pike, lake whitefish, goldeye, mooneye, white sucker, shorthead redhorse, longnose sucker, lake sturgeon and burbot.

See also 
List of lakes of Saskatchewan
North American fur trade

References

Lakes of Saskatchewan